Five Lake is a lake in Otter Tail County, in the U.S. state of Minnesota.

Five Lake was so named from its location in section 5 of the county.

See also
List of lakes in Minnesota

References

Lakes of Otter Tail County, Minnesota
Lakes of Minnesota